The 2009 Iranian Futsal 2nd Division will be divided into two phases.

The league will also be composed of 20 teams divided into two divisions of 10 teams each, whose teams will be divided geographically. Teams will play only other teams in their own division, once at home and once away for a total of 18 matches each.

Teams

Group A

Group B

Play Off 
First leg to be played 2 July 2009; return leg to be played 9 July 2009

 Gaz Khozestan Promoted to the 1st Division.

First leg

Return leg 

First leg to be played 2 July 2009; return leg to be played 9 July 2009

 Romatism Tehran Promoted to the 1st Division.

First leg

Return leg

References 

Iran Futsal's 2nd Division seasons
3
3